Leonardo Benzoni (died 24 March 1552) was a Roman Catholic prelate who served as Bishop of Vulturara e Montecorvino (1551–1552).

Biography
On 16 Mar 1551, Leonardo Benzoni was appointed during the papacy of Pope Julius III as Bishop of Vulturara e Montecorvino. He served as Bishop of Vulturara e Montecorvino until his death on 24 Mar 1552.

See also 
Catholic Church in Italy

References

External links and additional sources 
 (for Chronology of Bishops) 
 (for Chronology of Bishops) 

16th-century Italian Roman Catholic bishops
1552 deaths
Bishops appointed by Pope Julius III